Peter Pollák (born 20 April 1973 in Levoča) is a Slovak politician who was elected as a Member of the European Parliament in 2019.

References

Living people
MEPs for Slovakia 2019–2024
1973 births
Members of the National Council (Slovakia) 2012-2016
People from Levoča
Romani politicians